The 2018 NCAA Division I men's basketball tournament was a single-elimination tournament of 68 teams to determine the men's National Collegiate Athletic Association (NCAA) Division I college basketball national champion for the 2017–18 season. The 80th annual edition of the tournament began on March 13, 2018, and concluded with the championship game on April 2 at the Alamodome in San Antonio, Texas.

During the first round, UMBC became the first 16-seed to defeat a 1-seed in the men's tournament by defeating Virginia 74–54. For the first time in tournament history, none of the four top seeded teams in a single region (the South) advanced to the Sweet 16. The tournament also featured the first regional final matchup of a 9-seed (Kansas State) and an 11-seed (Loyola-Chicago).

Villanova, Michigan, Kansas, and Loyola Chicago, the "Cinderella team" of the tournament, reached the Final Four. Villanova defeated Michigan in the championship game, 79–62.

Atlantic Sun Conference champion Lipscomb made its NCAA tournament debut.

The 2018 tournament was the first time since 1978 that none of the six Division I college basketball-playing schools based in the Washington, DC metropolitan area – American, Georgetown, George Mason, George Washington, Howard, and Maryland – made the NCAA tournament.

Tournament procedure

	
A total of 68 teams entered the 2018 tournament. 32 automatic bids were awarded, one to each program that won their conference tournament. The remaining 36 bids were "at-large", with selections extended by the NCAA Selection Committee.

Eight teams (the four lowest-seeded automatic qualifiers and the four lowest-seeded at-large teams) played in the First Four (the successor to what had been popularly known as "play-in games" through the 2010 tournament). The winners of these games advanced to the main draw of the tournament.

The Selection Committee seeded the entire field from 1 to 68.

Schedule and venues

The following sites were selected to host each round of the 2018 tournament:

First Four
March 13 and 14
University of Dayton Arena, Dayton, Ohio (Host: University of Dayton)

First and Second Rounds
March 15 and 17
 PPG Paints Arena, Pittsburgh, Pennsylvania (Host: Duquesne University)
 Intrust Bank Arena, Wichita, Kansas (Host: Wichita State University)
 American Airlines Center, Dallas, Texas (Host: Big 12 Conference)
 Taco Bell Arena, Boise, Idaho (Host: Boise State University)
March 16 and 18
 Spectrum Center, Charlotte, North Carolina (Host: University of North Carolina at Charlotte)
 Little Caesars Arena, Detroit, Michigan (Host: University of Detroit Mercy)
 Bridgestone Arena, Nashville, Tennessee (Host: Ohio Valley Conference)
 Viejas Arena, San Diego, California (Host: San Diego State University)

Regional semifinals and Finals (Sweet Sixteen and Elite Eight)
March 22 and 24
West Regional, Staples Center, Los Angeles, California (Host: Pepperdine University)
South Regional, Philips Arena, Atlanta, Georgia (Host: Georgia Institute of Technology)
March 23 and 25
East Regional, TD Garden, Boston, Massachusetts (Host: Boston College)
Midwest Regional, CenturyLink Center Omaha, Omaha, Nebraska (Host: Creighton University)

National semifinals and championship (Final Four and championship)
March 31 and April 2
Alamodome, San Antonio, Texas (Host: University of Texas at San Antonio)

The state of North Carolina was threatened with a 2018-2022 championship venue boycott by the NCAA, due to the HB2 law passed in 2016. However, the law was repealed (but with provisos) days before the NCAA met to make decisions on venues in April 2017. At that time, the NCAA board of governors "reluctantly voted to allow consideration of championship bids in North Carolina by our committees that are presently meeting". Therefore, Charlotte was eligible and served as a first weekend venue for the 2018 tournament.

Qualification and selection

Four teams, out of 351 in Division I, were ineligible to participate in the 2018 tournament due to failing to meet APR requirements: Alabama A&M, Grambling State, Savannah State, and Southeast Missouri State. However, the NCAA granted the Savannah State Tigers a waiver which would have allowed the team to participate in the tournament, but the team failed to qualify.

Automatic qualifiers
The following 32 teams were automatic qualifiers for the 2018 NCAA field by virtue of winning their conference's automatic bid.

Tournament seeds
The tournament seeds were determined through the NCAA basketball tournament selection process. The seeds and regions were determined as follows:

*See First Four

Regional brackets
All times are listed as Eastern Daylight Time (UTC−4)
* – Denotes overtime period

First Four – Dayton, Ohio
The First Four games involved eight teams: the four overall lowest-ranked teams, and the four lowest-ranked at-large teams.

{{align|left|{{2TeamBracket | RD1= March 14 – Midwest Region
| team-width = 
| RD1-seed1=11
| RD1-team1=Syracuse
| RD1-score1=60
| RD1-seed2=11
| RD1-team2=Arizona State'| RD1-score2=56
}}}}

South Regional – Atlanta, Georgia

South Regional Final

South Regional all tournament team
 Ben Richardson (Sr, Loyola Chicago) – South Regional most outstanding player
 Clayton Custer (Jr, Loyola Chicago)
 Donte Ingram (Sr, Loyola Chicago)
 Xavier Sneed (So, Kansas State)
 Barry Brown Jr. (Jr, Kansas State)

West Regional – Los Angeles, California

West Regional Final

West Regional all tournament team
 Charles Matthews (So, Michigan) – West Regional most outstanding player
 Moritz Wagner (Jr, Michigan)
 Muhammad-Ali Abdur-Rahkman (Sr, Michigan)
 Phil Cofer (Sr, Florida State)
 Terance Mann (Jr, Florida State)

East Regional – Boston, Massachusetts

East Regional Final

East Regional all tournament team
 Jalen Brunson (Jr, Villanova) – East Regional most outstanding player
 Omari Spellman (Fr, Villanova)
 Eric Paschall (Jr, Villanova)
 Carsen Edwards (So, Purdue)
 Keenan Evans (Sr, Texas Tech)

Midwest Regional – Omaha, Nebraska

Midwest Regional Final

Midwest Regional all tournament team
 Malik Newman (So, Kansas) – Midwest Regional most outstanding player
 Trevon Duval (Fr, Duke)
 Gabe DeVoe (Sr, Clemson)
 Marvin Bagley III (Fr, Duke)
 Devonte' Graham (Sr, Kansas)
 Gary Trent Jr. (Fr, Duke)

Final Four
During the Final Four round, regardless of the seeds of the participating teams, the champion of the top overall top seed's region (Virginia's South Region) plays against the champion of the fourth-ranked top seed's region (Xavier's West Region), and the champion of the second overall top seed's region (Villanova's East Region) plays against the champion of the third-ranked top seed's region (Kansas' Midwest Region).

Alamodome – San Antonio, Texas

National semifinals

National Championship

Final Four all-tournament team
 Donte DiVincenzo (So, Villanova) – Final Four Most Outstanding Player
 Mikal Bridges (Jr, Villanova)
 Jalen Brunson (Jr, Villanova)
 Eric Paschall (Jr, Villanova)
 Moritz Wagner (Jr, Michigan)

Game summaries and tournament notes

Upsets
Per the NCAA, "Upsets are defined as when the winner of the game was seeded five or more places lower than the team it defeated." The 2018 tournament saw a total of 11 upsets; 5 of them were in the first round, 5 of them were in the second round, and one of them was in the Sweet Sixteen.

Record by conference

The R64, R32, S16, E8, F4, CG, and NC columns indicate how many teams from each conference were in the round of 64 (first round), round of 32 (second round), Sweet 16, Elite Eight, Final Four, championship game, and national champion, respectively.
The "Record" column includes wins in the First Four for the ACC, Atlantic 10, Big South, and SWAC conferences and two losses in the First Four for the Pac-12 conference.
The MEAC and NEC conferences each had one representative, eliminated in the First Four with a record of 0–1.
The Atlantic Sun, Big Sky, Big West, CAA, Horizon, Ivy League, MAAC, Ohio Valley, Patriot, Southern, Southland, Summit, Sun Belt and WAC conferences each had one representative, eliminated in the first round with a record of 0–1.

The Pac-12 lost all of its teams after the first day of the main tournament draw, marking the first time since the Big 12 began play in 1996 that one of the six major conferences—defined as the ACC, Big Ten, Big 12, Pac-12, SEC, and both versions of the Big East—failed to have a team advance to the tournament's round of 32.

Media coverage

Television
CBS Sports and Turner Sports had U.S. television rights to the Tournament under the NCAA March Madness brand. As part of a cycle beginning in 2016, TBS held the rights to the Final Four and to the championship game.

For the first time, TBS held the rights to the Selection Show, which expanded into a two-hour format, was presented in front of a studio audience, and promoted that the entire field of the tournament would be unveiled within the first ten minutes of the broadcast. However, this entailed the 68-team field  (beginning with automatic qualifiers, followed by at-large teams) being revealed in alphabetical order, and not by bracket matchups (which was done later in the show). The new format was criticized for lacking suspense, and the show also faced criticism for technical issues, as well as a segment containing product placement for Pizza Hut.

Television channels
First Four – TruTV
First and Second Rounds – CBS, TBS, TNT, and TruTV
Regional semifinals and Finals (Sweet Sixteen and Elite Eight) – CBS and TBS
National semifinals (Final Four) and championship – TBS

Studio hosts
 Greg Gumbel (New York City and San Antonio) – First round, second round, Regionals, Final Four and National Championship Game
 Ernie Johnson Jr. (New York City, Atlanta, and San Antonio) – First round, second round, Regional Semi-Finals, Final Four and National Championship Game
 Casey Stern (Atlanta) – First Four, first round and Second Round

Studio analysts
 Charles Barkley (New York City and San Antonio) – First round, second round, Regionals, Final Four and National Championship Game
 Seth Davis (Atlanta and San Antonio) – First Four, first round, second round, Regional Semi-Finals, Final Four and National Championship Game
 Brendan Haywood (Atlanta and San Antonio) – First Four, first round, second round, Regional Semi-Finals and Final Four
 Clark Kellogg (New York City and San Antonio) – First round, second round, Regionals, Final Four and National Championship Game
 Gregg Marshall (Atlanta) – Regional Semi-Finals
 Frank Martin (Atlanta) – Second Round
 Candace Parker (Atlanta and San Antonio) – First Four, first round, second round, Regional Semi-Finals and Final Four
 Kenny Smith (New York City and San Antonio) – First round, second round, Regionals, Final Four and National Championship Game
 Wally Szczerbiak (New York City) – Second Round
 Brad Underwood (Atlanta) – First round
 Christian Laettner (San Antonio) – Final Four
 Danny Manning (San Antonio) – Final Four
 Kris Jenkins (San Antonio) – Final Four

Commentary teams
 Jim Nantz/Bill Raftery/Grant Hill/Tracy Wolfson – First and Second Rounds at Charlotte, North Carolina; Midwest Regional at Omaha, Nebraska; Final Four and National Championship at San Antonio, Texas
 Brian Anderson/Chris Webber/Lisa Byington – First and Second Rounds at Boise, Idaho; South Regional at Atlanta, Georgia
 Ian Eagle/Jim Spanarkel/Allie LaForce – First Four at Dayton, Ohio (Wednesday); First and Second Rounds at Detroit, Michigan; East Regional at Boston, Massachusetts
 Kevin Harlan/Reggie Miller/Dan Bonner/Dana Jacobson – First and Second Rounds at Pittsburgh, Pennsylvania; West Regional at Los Angeles, California
 Brad Nessler/Steve Lavin/Evan Washburn – First and Second Rounds at Wichita, Kansas
 Spero Dedes/Steve Smith/Len Elmore/Rosalyn Gold-Onwude – First Four at Dayton, Ohio (Tuesday); First and Second Rounds at Dallas, Texas
 Andrew Catalon/Steve Lappas/Jamie Erdahl – First and Second Rounds at Nashville, Tennessee
 Carter Blackburn/Debbie Antonelli/John Schriffen – First and Second Rounds at San Diego, California

Team Stream broadcasts
Final Four
Matt Park/Jay Feely/Dr. Sanjay Gupta – Michigan Team Stream on TNT
Jeff Hagedorn/Jerry Harkness/Shams Charania – Loyola–Chicago Team Stream on truTV
Dave Armstrong/Scot Pollard/Rob Riggle– Kansas Team Stream on TNT
Scott Graham/Randy Foye/Kacie McDonnell – Villanova Team Stream on truTV
National Championship Game
Matt Park/Jay Feely/Dr. Sanjay Gupta – Michigan Team Stream on TNT
Scott Graham/Randy Foye/Kacie McDonnell – Villanova Team Stream on truTV

Radio
Westwood One had exclusive radio rights to the entire tournament.

First Four
Ted Emrich and Austin Croshere – at Dayton, Ohio

First and Second rounds
Scott Graham and Kelly Tripucka – Pittsburgh, Pennsylvania
Brandon Gaudin and Donny Marshall – Wichita, Kansas
Ryan Radtke and Jim Jackson – Dallas, Texas
Jason Benetti and Dan Dickau – Boise, Idaho
Kevin Kugler and Eric Montross/John Thompson – Charlotte, North Carolina (Montross – Friday night; Thompson – Friday Afternoon & Sunday)
Chris Carrino and P. J. Carlesimo – Detroit, Michigan
Ted Emrich – Friday Afternoon/Craig Way – Friday Night & Sunday and Will Perdue – Nashville, Tennessee 
John Sadak and Mike Montgomery – San Diego, California

Regionals
Gary Cohen and P. J. Carlesimo – East Regional at Boston, Massachusetts
Kevin Kugler and Donny Marshall – Midwest Regional at Omaha, Nebraska
Brandon Gaudin and John Thompson – South Regional at Atlanta, Georgia
Tom McCarthy and Jim Jackson – West Regional at Los Angeles, California

Final Four
Kevin Kugler, John Thompson, Clark Kellogg, and Jim Gray – San Antonio, Texas

Internet

Video
Live video of games was available for streaming through the following means:
 NCAA March Madness Live (website and app, no CBS games on digital media players; access to games on Turner channels requires TV Everywhere authentication through provider; 3 hour preview for Turner games is provided before authentication is required)
 CBS All Access (only CBS games, service subscription required)
 CBS Sports website and app (only CBS games)
 Bleacher Report website and Team Stream'' app (only Turner games, access requires subscription)
 Watch TBS website and app (only TBS games, requires TV Everywhere authentication)
 Watch TNT website and app (only TNT games, requires TV Everywhere authentication)
 Watch truTV website and app (only truTV games, requires TV Everywhere authentication)
 Websites and apps of cable, satellite, and OTT providers of CBS & Turner (access requires subscription)

Audio
Live audio of games was available for streaming through the following means:
 NCAA March Madness Live (website and app)
 Westwood One Sports website
 TuneIn (website and app)
 Websites and apps of Westwood One Sports affiliates

See also

 2018 NCAA Division II men's basketball tournament
 2018 NCAA Division III men's basketball tournament
 2018 NAIA Division I men's basketball tournament
 2018 U Sports Men's Basketball Championship
 2018 UMBC vs. Virginia men's basketball game

References

Ncaa tournament
NCAA Division I men's basketball tournament
Basketball in San Antonio
NCAA Division I Men's Basketball
21st century in San Antonio